MV Princess of Acadia was a roll-on/roll-off passenger and motor vehicle ferry that traveled between Digby, Nova Scotia and Saint John, New Brunswick, crossing the Bay of Fundy. The vessel holds 650 passengers and can transport 180 automobile equivalents.

Career
In 1969 Canadian Pacific Limited subsidiary CP Ships sought to renew its Digby - Saint John passenger-only ferry service operated by SS Princess of Acadia.  The federal government subsidized construction of the new passenger and motor vehicle ferry Princess of Acadia at Saint John Shipbuilding & Dry Dock Co., Ltd. and built new ferry terminals at Digby and Saint John in exchange for a commitment from CP Ships to operate the service until such time as it was no longer profitable. Princess of Acadia entered service in June 1971, replacing her namesake, and operated on the Digby - Saint John route for CP Ships until the service began to lose money by the mid-1970s.

Under the terms of the 1969 agreement, CP Ships transferred ownership of the vessel in 1976 to the Minister of Transport.  The federal government transferred management of the vessel to the newly created Crown corporation CN Marine.  In 1986 CN Marine was renamed Marine Atlantic.  In 1997 the federal government removed itself from managing the vessel and operating and subsidizing the Digby - Saint John route.  The winning bidder for the service was Bay Ferries, a subsidiary of Northumberland Ferries Limited (NFL); the federal government remains the owner of the vessel and the ferry terminals.

Princess of Acadia continued in service under the management of Bay Ferries after 1997. In the mid-2000s, the rising operating costs and absence of a subsidy from the federal government began to raise the issue of whether the ferry was sustainable.  Beginning in 2006 both the provincial governments of New Brunswick and Nova Scotia as well as the Government of Canada extended an operating subsidy to Bay Ferries to keep the service operating. The Digby-to-Saint John ferry service received another subsidy from federal government in July 2014.

In 2013 the federal government announced $60 million in funding toward a replacement of Princess of Acadia. On 27 October 2014 the Federal Government announced the purchase from Blue Star Ferries, Greece of Blue Star Ithaki, built in 2000, for about €31 million. She will enter service in Canada in 2015.

Princess of Acadia was scrapped in Port Colborne, Ontario by Marine Recycling Corporation in 2018.

Notes

References
 Musk, George. (1981).  Canadian Pacific: The Story of the Famous Shipping Line.  Toronto: Holt, Rinehart and Winston of Canada. ;  OCLC 7540915

External links
Bay Ferries

Ships of CP Ships
CN Marine
Marine Atlantic
Ferries of Nova Scotia
Ferries of New Brunswick
1971 ships
Ships built in New Brunswick
Transport in Digby County, Nova Scotia
Transport in Saint John, New Brunswick